In Your Wildest Dreams is an EP by the alternative country band Whiskeytown, released as a promotional item in 1997.

"The Rain Won't Help You When It's Over" is a True Believers cover.  The song's composer, Alejandro Escovedo, had this to say about the song: “I’ve always held that song very dear because it’s the first one I ever wrote and it was such a staple of the [True] Believers’ set and sound... ‘Rain’ holds a special place for me, but I always felt the Believers never did a great recording of that tune.  So I was happy to hear Whiskeytown did it.  I love their version of it.  Even though Ryan forgot the second verse.”

Track listing

Personnel and production credits
 Ryan Adams —  acoustic & electric guitars, singing, banjo, piano, percussion
 Phil Wandscher —  electric guitar, singing, organ, percussion
 Caitlin Cary —  violin, singing
 Steve Terry — drums, singing, percussion
 Jeff Rice — the bass guitar
1 & 4 produced, engineered, and mixed by Jim Scott
2 & 3 produced by Chris Stamey, recorded by Tim Harper

References

Whiskeytown EPs
1997 EPs